This is a list of the top-level leaders for religious groups with at least 50,000 adherents, and that led anytime from January 1, 401, to December 31, 500. It should likewise only name leaders listed on other articles and lists.

Christianity

Chalcedonian Christianity
Church of Rome (complete list) –
Anastasius I, Pope (399–401)
Innocent I, Pope (401–417)
Zosimus, Pope (417–418)
Boniface I, Pope (418–422)
Celestine I, Pope (422–432)
Sixtus III, Pope (432–440)
Leo I the Great, Pope (440–461)
Hilarius, Pope (461–468)
Simplicius, Pope (468–483)
Felix III, Pope (483–492)
Gelasius I, Pope (492–496)
Anastasius II, Pope (496–498)
Symmachus, Pope (498–514)

Church of Constantinople (complete list) –
John Chrysostom, Archbishop (398–404)
Arsacius of Tarsus, Archbishop (404–405)
Atticus, Archbishop (406–425)
Sisinnius I, Archbishop (426–427)
Nestorius, Archbishop (428–431)
Maximianus, Archbishop (431–434)
Proclus, Archbishop (434–446)
Flavian, Archbishop (446–449)
Anatolius –
Archbishop of Constantinople (449–451)
Patriarch of Constantinople (451–458)
Gennadius I, Patriarch of Constantinople (458–471)
Acacius, Patriarch of Constantinople (471–488)
Fravitas, Patriarch of Constantinople (488–489)
Euphemius, Patriarch of Constantinople (489–495)
Macedonius II, Patriarch of Constantinople (495–511)

Church of Alexandria (complete list) –
Theophilus I, Patriarch of Alexandria (385–412)
Cyril I, Patriarch of Alexandria (412–444)

As recognized by Chalcedonian Christianity
Dioscorus I, Patriarch of Alexandria (444–451; deposed by Chalcedon)
Proterius, Patriarch of Alexandria (451–457)
Timothy II Aelurus, Patriarch of Alexandria (457–460, 475–477)
Timothy III Salophakiolos, Patriarch of Alexandria (460–475, 477–481)
Timothy II Aelurus, Patriarch of Alexandria (457–460, 475–477)
Peter III Mongus, Patriarch of Alexandria (477, 482–490)
Timothy III Salophakiolos, Patriarch of Alexandria (460–475, 477–481)
John I Talaias, Patriarch of Alexandria (481–482)
Peter III Mongus, Patriarch of Alexandria (477, 482–490)As recognized by Coptic Christianity
Dioscorus I, Pope & Patriarch (444–454) 
Timothy II Aelurus, Pope & Patriarch (454–477)
Peter III Mongus, Pope & Patriarch (477–490)

Athanasius II Kelitis, Patriarch of Alexandria (490–496)
John II the Monk, Patriarch of Alexandria (496–505)

Church of Antioch (complete list) –
Flavian I, Patriarch of Antioch (399–404)
Porphyrus, Patriarch of Antioch (404–412)
Alexander, Patriarch of Antioch (412–417)
Theodotus, Patriarch of Antioch (417–428)
John I, Patriarch of Antioch (428–442)
Domnus II, Patriarch of Antioch (442–449) – deposed at Ephesus II
Maximus, Patriarch of Antioch (449–455)
Basil of Antioch, Patriarch of Antioch (456–458)
Acacius of Antioch, Patriarch of Antioch (458–461)
Martyrius, Patriarch of Antioch (461–469)
Peter the Fuller (469/470–471), Non-Chalcedonian supported by Zeno
Julian, Patriarch of Antioch (471–476)
Peter the Fuller (476), Non-Chalcedonian supported by Basiliscus
John II Codonatus (476–477), Non-Chalcedonian
Stephanus II, Patriarch of Antioch (477–479)
Calendion, Patriarch of Antioch (479–485)
Peter the Fuller (485–488), Non-Chalcedonian supported by Zeno
Palladius, Patriarch of Antioch (488–498)
Flavian II, Patriarch of Antioch (498–512)

Church of Jerusalem –
Juvenal –
Bishop of Jerusalem (422–451)
Patriarch of Jerusalem (451–458)
Anastasius I, Patriarch of Jerusalem (458–478)
Martyrius, Patriarch of Jerusalem (478–486)
Sallustius, Patriarch of Jerusalem (486–494)
Elias I, Patriarch of Jerusalem (494–516)

Judaism

Rabbinic Judaism

Nasi of the Sanhedrin
Raban Gamaliel VI, Nasi (c.400–425)

Babylon
Ravina I, prominent Talmudist and Rabbi (?–420)
Rav Ashi, prominent Talmudist and Rabbi (352–427)
Mar bar Rav Ashi, prominent Talmudist and Rabbi (c.430–c.465)
Ravina II, prominent Talmudist and Rabbi (?–474/499)
Rav Rahumi III, prominent Talmudist and Rabbi (c.465–c.500)

See also

Religious leaders by year

References

External links
 http://www.rulers.org/relig.html

05th century
Religious leaders
 
Religious Leaders